WADI (95.3 FM, "The Bee") is a radio station licensed to serve the community of Corinth, Mississippi, United States.  The station is owned by The Eagle Radio Network, Inc. It broadcasts a hot country music format.

The station was assigned the WADI call letters by the Federal Communications Commission.

The programming is simulcast through a LMA arrangement on WXWX-FM,.

As of April 30th, 2022, the programming is now also broadcast on translator frequency W254AA  which serves the community of Colbert Heights, Alabama and the Quad-Cities of North Alabama through an agreement between owners.

References

External links
WADI/WXWX Facebook

ADI
Country radio stations in the United States
Alcorn County, Mississippi